This is the discography of Lil' Flip, an American rapper.

Albums

Studio albums

Independent albums

EPs

Soundtrack albums

Collaboration albums

Compilation albums

Mixtapes

Singles

As lead artist

As featured performer

Promotional singles

Guest appearances

References

Hip hop discographies
Discographies of American artists